Raleigh Little Theatre (RLT) is a community theatre in Raleigh, North Carolina, that produces 10 to 11 full productions annually and conducts youth and adult theatre education programs.

About
Raleigh Little Theatre was established in 1936 to provide community theatre performances and opportunities for residents. RLT produces 11 shows each season, professionally supported by complete on-site costume and scene shops, along with a full and part-time professional staff of 16 and more than 600 community volunteers. With the largest subscription base of any community theatre in the area (3,000+), RLT serves more than 40,000 people with shows each season. A total of 10 to 11 shows are produced annually, professionally supported by complete on-site costume and scene shops.

History
Raleigh Little Theatre started in 1935-36 when a group of Raleigh performers joined forces with technical workers from the Federal Theatre Project to bring community theatre to Raleigh. The theatre celebrated its 75th Anniversary Season in 2010-2011. The Piano Lesson, in October 2010, was the theatre's 600th production.

Then, civic leader Cantey Venable Sutton started the Works Progress Administration construction of the main theatre, amphitheatre, and Rose Garden. In 2000, the main theatre was named in honor of Sutton. RLT's annual performance awards, given each June, have been called "Canteys" in her honor for a number of decades.

RLT was the first community theatre in the South to cast actors of color during segregation.

Venues
The Raleigh Little Theatre facility includes three on-site venues: the 298-seat Cantey V. Sutton Theatre built in 1939; the outdoor 2000-seat RLT's Louise "Scottie" Stephenson Amphitheatre, also built in 1939; and the 150-seat Gaddy-Goodwin Teaching Theatre built in 1990.

Special events
Raleigh Little Theatre stages several special events throughout the year. Some of these are fundraisers for the theatre, others for social gatherings to recognize volunteers. Among these are:

Divas!
The Canteys
Costume Sale

Youth education programs

Each year, RLT serves more than 900 children and adults in its year-round on-site and satellite education programs through the Dianne Davidian Education Program. In addition, more than 1,000 Wake County students are served in the classroom, at youth organizations and on-site are reached through its RLT Blue Cross and Blue Shield of North Carolina Active Arts Outreach Program.

In 2003, RLT launched its RLT/Blue Cross and Blue Shield of North Carolina Arts Active Outreach Program to bring its award-winning, process-oriented, youth education program directly into the classroom. During the first six months of the program, more than 1,000 students had the opportunity to experience the theatrical arts either through workshops, in-classroom residencies or special performances in schools that otherwise would not have been possible.

Notable performers

Andy Griffith performed at RLT in the early 1940s
Frankie Muniz
Clay Aiken
Ava Gardner
Lachlan Watson

See also
List of contemporary amphitheatres

References

External links
 
 

Music venues in North Carolina
Theatres in Raleigh, North Carolina
Amphitheaters in North Carolina
Buildings and structures in Raleigh, North Carolina
Works Progress Administration in North Carolina
Tourist attractions in Raleigh, North Carolina